ZC, Zc, or zC may refer to:

 ZC, in set theory, a formal system with Zermelo's first five axioms plus the axiom of choice
 Zadoff–Chu sequence, in mathematics, a certain complex-valued sequence with the CAZAC property 
 Zangger Committee, a committee on nuclear proliferation
 Zeptocoulomb, another SI unit of electric charge
 Zettacoulomb, an SI unit of electric charge
 Zimbabwe Cricket, the governing body for cricket in Zimbabwe
 Honda D engine, an engine variant produced by Honda Motor Company
Zc(3900), a subatomic particle